Thelen may refer to:

People
 A. J. Thelen (born 1986), retired American professional ice hockey defenseman
 Albert Vigoleis Thelen (1903-1989), German author and translator
 Dave Thelen (born 1936), former Canadian Football League running back
 Eduard Thelen (born 1943), former German field hockey player 
 Esther Thelen (1941-2004), American developmental psychologist
 Fanny Thelen (1856 - 1939), American clubwoman
 Frank Thelen (born 1975), German businessman
 Jodi Thelen (born 1962), American actress
 Kathleen Thelen, American professor
 Michael Thelen (1834–1918), German-American politician
 Nathan Thelen, one of the founding members of the band Pretty Girls Make Graves
 Paul Thelen, chairman and chief executive officer of Big Fish Games
 Robert Thelen (1884-1968), German aviation pioneer and designer
 Robert Thelen III, one of the founders of The Mendota Beacon
 Tim Thelen (born 1961), American professional golfer

Other uses
 Thelen LLP, a former American law firm
 Thelen Madagascar Frog, a common name for the frog Gephyromantis thelenae